Jesse Adam Al-Zaid (born March 21, 1984; name changed from Jesse Adam Macbeth in 1986) is an American anti-war protester, author, and military imposter, who was convicted of falsely claiming to be an Army Ranger and veteran of the Iraq War. In alternative media interviews, Macbeth fabricated claims that he and his unit routinely committed war crimes in Iraq. Transcripts of the video were made in English and Arabic.

According to the U.S. Army, there is no record of Macbeth being a Ranger, or serving in a combat unit. Macbeth was discharged from the Army after having been declared unfit or unsuitable for the Army, or both, before he could complete basic training. After his release, Macbeth presented himself as a veteran, telling war stories and garnering attention from mainstream, alternative and student media outlets. 

He joined Iraq Veterans Against the War in January 2006, and represented, or was scheduled to represent them, publicly at various events throughout the country before the organization required proof of service. The organization later said it did not endorse Macbeth or his accounts of military service. Accounts in Macbeth's name appear on Military.com and Myspace.com, and both were used to post claims about military service in Iraq.

On September 21, 2007 Macbeth admitted in federal court that he had faked his war record. U.S. Attorney Jeffrey Sullivan declared that Macbeth had been in the Army for just 44 days and had been dismissed as unfit.

Allegations and other claims
Macbeth alleged  Iraq war atrocities in interviews posted to the Internet as web pages and video. He was featured in the 2006 PepperSpray Productions video, posted at Peacefilms.org, Jessie Macbeth: Former Army Ranger and Iraq War Veteran. A link to the video was posted May 21, 2006 on the community blog Metafilter.

PepperSpray Productions video
The video begins with narration, explaining that Macbeth "...served in Iraq for 16 months before being wounded..." Afterward, Macbeth made numerous allegations of executions, including of women and children, and of other atrocities. None of these were true. At the end of the video, he commented that the mainstream media would not cover him, which was why independent media are necessary so that truth could be disseminated. No other known primary sources have described the atrocities that Macbeth described, all of which would certainly be violations of Geneva Conventions. The video repeatedly referenced Iraq Veterans Against the War, although the organization later stated that the use of its name was unauthorized.

IVAW has since required documentation of service in order to protect its members from frauds such as Macbeth. PepperSpray removed the video from its site on May 23, 2006 after U.S. Army spokesman John Boyce said Macbeth had never been a U.S. Army Ranger. PepperSpray Productions later issued a statement of retraction, noting "when we learned that Macbeth's service records were fraudulent, we immediately pulled the video and are no longer distributing it." Transcripts of the video were made in English and Arabic.

Uniform discrepancies
Macbeth's uniform as worn in the video was inconsistent with Army regulations, and in some cases, inconsistent with his purported identity. Boyce is quoted in Stars and Stripes as saying "There are... numerous wear and appearance issues with the soldier's uniform – a mix of foreign uniforms with the sleeves rolled up like a Marine and a badly floppy tan beret worn like a pastry chef."

Stars and Stripes reported that Macbeth wore his beret with the insignia over the wrong eye and the beret is pulled to the wrong side of his head. All US Army berets are worn with the insignia over the left eye, with the extra material pulled to the right side of the head, and not the left as shown in his picture. His undershirt is black. The US Army wears brown undershirts under their BDUs. His mustache is out of regulation by extending past the corner of the mouth.

socialistalternative.org interview
Macbeth was quoted in an April 26, 2006 SocialistAlternative.org article as saying "We would leave the bodies in the streets and blame it on the Shi'ites or the Sunnis. [In Fallujah] we were ordered to go into mosques and slaughter people while they were praying."

Macbeth was quoted as saying he had been "stabbed many times", has shrapnel in his knee, was shot in the back, and had been awarded the Purple Heart. He claimed his unit was the 3rd Ranger Battalion. That unit did not participate in the occupation of Fallujah. Macbeth said he was "picked" for Ranger School. Ranger School students are strictly volunteers. The article was replaced May 26, 2006 with a statement rejecting "use of false statements in the mistaken belief that they can in some way strengthen opposition to the war."

Eastern Arizona Courier article
On November 3, 2003, Pam Crandall, a reporter for the Eastern Arizona Courier, interviewed Macbeth. In the interview he reportedly made false claims that he had returned from Iraq two and a half months prior – roughly in late August 2003, after sustaining a back injury. The article quoted Macbeth falsely stating he had been shot in the back by an M16 rifle while in an Iraqi tunnel, but that a Canadian nurse stitched him up and he continued fighting. Canada was not a participant in the Multinational force in Iraq at the time of the article's publication.

The article states that Macbeth falsely claims to have attended a hearing that month, about a medical discharge from the Army, alleging he had undergone surgeries to remove shrapnel from his back. Macbeth falsely claimed in the article that "The Iraqis would stand in a crowd and shoot at us. We had to kill civilians to get to them because we were ordered to shoot anything that came at us. I keep having nightmares about it." The EA Courier later ran a story detailing Macbeth's fraudulent claims.

Crandall stated, "after learning that MacBeth (sic) lied about his past, I was shocked and surprised. He seemed very sincere and looked me directly in the eye throughout the interview process. I never suspected that his story might be false, due both to his behavior during the interview and the consequences one would experience for lying about his or her own military service. I would never have willingly repeated his claims had I known they were untrue."

Army service and afterwards
Macbeth's DD-214 form, which is a "Certificate of Release or Discharge from Active Duty", shows he entered U.S. Army service on May 1, 2003. He left the Army on June 13, 2003, without completing basic training, and with no authorization for decorations, medals, badges, citations or campaign ribbons, with no service whatsoever in Iraq.

The first known media report of Macbeth representing himself as an Iraq war veteran was the Eastern Arizona Courier article. An April 6, 2004 Arizona Indymedia article places him at the center of a dispute at a coffee shop near a campus of Arizona State University. Macbeth alleged that he was asked to leave the shop because he was wearing his uniform. The dispute eventually became a protest, covered in articles and editorials by the Arizona State University student newspaper, The State Press.

An April 23, 2004 guest editorial attributed to Macbeth also appeared in The State Press about the protest and dispute, claiming he had already spent 16 months in Iraq. The war had only begun 13 months earlier at that point. The writer asserted he was about to be redeployed. On September 28, 2004, Macbeth was convicted of fraudulent use of a credit card in Graham County (Arizona) Superior Court. Court records pertaining to the case also indicate parole activity through May 2006.

Macbeth joined Iraq Veterans Against the War in January 2006, and represented, or was scheduled to represent them on several occasions. The group publicly severed ties with Macbeth on May 27, 2006, stating "... Jesse is not what he represented himself to be."

May 23, 2006, Pierce County, Washington Superior Court issued a bench warrant for Jesse Adam Macbeth. Underlying charges of violating a protective court order and fourth degree assault.

Military.com membership
A Military.com user profile for "Jesse a Macbeth" listed among his ribbons a Bronze Star (without a valor device), a Purple Heart, an Army Good Conduct Medal, a National Defense Service Medal, an Army Service Ribbon, and an Overseas Service Ribbon. He listed among his badges the Ranger tab, the Special Forces tab, two awards of the Combat Infantry Badge (CIB), two awards of the Combat Action Badge (CAB), A Parachutist Badge with three combat  service stars, and a marksmanship award.

Decoration with both the CIB and CAB is possible under certain circumstances, though impossible without switching operational specialities. Decoration with two awards of the CIB is not possible without combat service prior to Operation Iraqi Freedom. Decoration with two awards of the CAB was not possible at the time of the profile's posting. 

A Parachutist Badge with 3 combat stars is not possible without having served in the 1989-1990 Operation Just Cause or an earlier conflict. On May 22, 2006, the profile had been updated to remove the decorations, though the profile still asserts service from 2001 to 2005 with the 3rd Battalion, 75th Infantry Regiment, an Army Ranger unit.

Military.com does not check the identities of any of its users. Although the account is associated with Macbeth and features his photograph and mentions an Iraq Veterans Against the War affiliation, it is possible that the account was set up by someone else. The account has been active since 2005. Military.com also does not require proof of military service before professing veteran status. False or misleading statements of fact violate the Military.com user agreement.

In custody
Macbeth had a warrant issued against him, pursuant to which he was apprehended and booked on November 16, 2006.
The Pierce County Legal Information Network Exchange lists 2 counts of felony domestic violence court order violation (held on $20,000 cash or bail bonds), 2 counts of assault in the fourth degree ($5,000 cash-only bail, as well as being committed to custody) and 2 counts "other concurrent assault in the fourth degree charges", and interfering with the reporting of domestic violence (committed to custody).

Charge and guilty plea
On May 18, 2007, a criminal complaint was unsealed in the United States District Court in Seattle, Washington, charging Macbeth with one count of using or possessing a forged or altered military discharge certificate and one count of making false statements in seeking benefits from the Veterans Administration. The complaint alleged that Macbeth had posed as an Iraq war veteran and illicitly collected more than $10,400 in benefits.

On June 7, 2007, Macbeth pleaded guilty to one count of making false statements to the U.S. Department of Veterans Affairs. He was sentenced on September 21, 2007 to 5 months in jail and three years' probation.

Further legal issues 
In 2011, Macbeth was arrested multiple times in Pierce County, Washington, for harassment. A protection order was granted, barring Macbeth from communicating with the victim.

In November 2022, Macbeth claimed in the Franklin County, Ohio Superior Court, that he was “sexually harassed.” Franklin County Superior Court denied the request due to a lack of merit and inconsistencies on Macbeth’s part.

References

External links
Mirrored edition of the original video Wizbang
Ranger School Class Photos, benning.army.mil; accessed March 15, 2015.
"Coffee Plantation: what's the story", Arizona Indymedia
The War the Media is Not Reporting — An Iraqi Veteran Speaks Out, archive of original interview at SocialistAlternative.org; accessed March 15, 2015.

1984 births
American anti-war activists
American Muslims
Impostors
Living people
People convicted of making false statements
Place of birth missing (living people)